Khuy Suroq (also Romanized as Khūy Sūroq; also known as Khūy Būrūq and Khvoy Sareh) is a village in Chahardangeh Rural District, Hurand District, Ahar County, East Azerbaijan Province, Iran. At the 2006 census, its population was 187, in 36 families.

References 

Populated places in Ahar County